Pseudopusula depauperata is a species of small sea snail, a marine gastropod mollusk in the family Triviidae, the false cowries or trivias.

Description

Distribution
This species occurs in the Atlantic Ocean off Congo and Angola.

References

External links

Triviidae
Gastropods described in 1832